The Neumarkt in Dresden is a central and culturally significant section of central Dresden, Germany. The historic area was almost completely wiped out during the Allied bomb attack during the Second World War. After the war Dresden fell under Soviet occupation and later the communist German Democratic Republic which rebuilt the Neumarkt area in socialist realist style and partially with historic buildings. However huge areas and parcels of the place remained untilled. After the fall of Communism and German reunification the decision was made to restore the Neumarkt to its pre-war look.

History
Due to its location on a slight rise above the flood-prone Elbe River, the Neumarkt was one of the first areas of Dresden's old city to be settled, with a small village arising around the old Frauenkirche. However, it was not actually located within the city walls until the city was expanded in 1530, from which point on, the old town contained two market squares. The square located around the Kreuzkirche was renamed Altmarkt (German for "Old Market"), and the square surrounding the Frauenkirche was named the Neumarkt ("New Market").

During the reign of August II the Strong, a great number of structures in Dresden were built in Baroque style, including the present-day Frauenkirche, and numerous other houses surrounding the Neumarkt. After damage sustained to buildings through artillery fire in the Seven Years' War, a number of structures on the Neumarkt were rebuilt in the Rococo/Late Baroque style.

During the 19th century and into the early 20th century, the Neumarkt remained largely unchanged, except for renovations to the Johanneum completed in 1873 and the construction of the Albertinum and Academy of Fine Arts completed at the end of the 1800s.

Bombing of Dresden and communist era
During the bomb attack on Dresden in February 1945, the area around the Neumarkt was almost entirely destroyed in the resulting firestorm. The main structure of the Frauenkirche survived the initial bombing and firestorm, before collapsing a few days later.  During the 1950s and 60s under rule of the German Democratic Republic, the Neumarkt and Altmarkt formed a mostly vacant area through the middle of the old city, save for the ruins of the Frauenkirche standing as a memorial to the horrors of war. The two squares were separated by the widened Wilsdruffer Strasse, then from 1969 by the Palace of Culture, and then later by new apartment blocks.

Reconstruction
The completion of the reconstructed Dresden Frauenkirche in 2005 marked the first step in rebuilding the Neumarkt.  Organisations such as the Dresden Historical Neumarkt Society (GHND) actively encourage an historically-faithful reconstruction of the structures around the Neumarkt, giving an outward appearance as close as possible to that from before 1945.

The areas around the square have been divided into eight "quarters", with each being rebuilt as a separate project, the majority of buildings to be rebuilt either to the original structure or at least with a facade similar to the original.

Quarter III and quarter VII/1 are currently (2020) under construction. All other quarters have been completed.

Controversy and criticism
The reconstruction of the structures surrounding the Neumarkt has created some controversy, with architecture critic Andreas Ruby criticising the attempt to reconstruct the historic character of the city as inauthentic, likening it to the recreation of Venice to be found at the Venetian Resort Hotel in Las Vegas.

There has also been extensive debate as to what extent contemporary architecture should be present on the rebuilt Neumarkt.

References

External links

Panorama images of the Neumarkt, updated hourly since June 2005

Historic districts in Germany
Boroughs and quarters of Dresden
Squares in Dresden
Building reconstruction projects in Germany
New Classical architecture